Baetisca is a genus of armored mayflies in the family Baetiscidae. There are about 12 described species in Baetisca.

Species
These 12 species belong to the genus Baetisca:

 Baetisca becki Schneider & Berner, 1963
 Baetisca berneri Tarter & Kirchner, 1978
 Baetisca callosa Traver, 1931
 Baetisca carolina Traver, 1931
 Baetisca columbiana Edmunds, 1960
 Baetisca escambiensis Berner, 1955
 Baetisca gibbera Berner, 1953
 Baetisca lacustris McDunnough, 1932
 Baetisca laurentina McDunnough, 1932
 Baetisca obesa (Say, 1839)
 Baetisca rogersi Berner, 1940
 Baetisca rubescens (Provancher, 1878)

References

Further reading

External links

 

Mayflies
Articles created by Qbugbot